Garrett Michael Willis (born November 21, 1973) is an American professional golfer who plays on the PGA Tour and the Nationwide Tour.

Willis was born in Charlotte, North Carolina. He attended East Tennessee State University where he was member of the golf team, a first-team All-American his senior year. He won the Canadian Amateur Championship in 1995. He graduated and turned professional in 1996.

Willis began his career in professional golf playing on the Hooters Tour and in selected international events. He then moved up to the BUY.COM Tour (the precursor of the Nationwide Tour). Willis made his debut on the PGA Tour at the Touchstone Energy Tucson Open in 2001, and became the fourth Tour player to win in his first start as a member joining Marty Fleckman (1967), Ben Crenshaw (1973) and Robert Gamez (1990).

In recent years, Willis has split his playing time between the PGA Tour and the Nationwide Tour. He posted a Nationwide Tour victory in 2005 at the Envirocare Utah Classic. He came close to winning again on the Nationwide Tour in 2007, when he and Justin Bolli finished tied for second, a single stroke behind Jay Williamson in the Fort Smith Classic.

Willis won again in 2009 on the Nationwide Tour at the WNB Golf Classic by one stroke over Chad Collins. He finished 12th on the money list to earn his 2010 PGA Tour card.

Willis lives in Knoxville, Tennessee with his wife, Jennifer. Willis last played a PGA Tour event in 2016.

Professional wins (8)

PGA Tour wins (1)

Nationwide Tour wins (2)

Nationwide Tour playoff record (0–1)

Other wins (5)
1996 Decatur Dailey Hooters Tour Championship (NGA Hooters Tour)
1997 Panama Open
2000 Tennessee Open
2013 Tennessee Open
2015 Tennessee Open

Results in major championships

Note: Willis only played in the U.S. Open.
CUT = missed the half-way cut

See also
2000 PGA Tour Qualifying School graduates
2009 Nationwide Tour graduates

References

External links

American male golfers
East Tennessee State Buccaneers men's golfers
PGA Tour golfers
Korn Ferry Tour graduates
Golfers from Charlotte, North Carolina
Golfers from Knoxville, Tennessee
1973 births
Living people